The 2009 Nike Cross Nationals were held at Portland Meadows in Portland, Oregon on December 5, 2009. It was the sixth edition of the nationals, and for the second year in a row individual runners were allowed to compete alongside team qualifiers. The boys' race was won by Craig Lutz, a junior from Marcus High School in Flower Mound, Texas, in a championship record time of 15:09.2 for the 5 km course. Lutz came from third to first in the closing stages of the race, overtaking Joe Rosa and just holding off a strong kick from Elias Gedyon. The top five finishers in the boys' race were all juniors.

On the team side, Boerne Samuel V. Champion High School from Boerne, Texas narrowly defeated Joel E. Ferris High School from Spokane, Washington and defending champion The Woodlands High School from The Woodlands, Texas. Boerne Champion held a narrow lead from 3 km on out, gaining the biggest advantage from their second runner Nathan Christianson who finished 16th in team scoring to Ferris' second runner Alexander Avilia who finished 36th.

The girls' race was won by Katie Flood, a senior from Dowling Catholic High School in Des Moines, Iowa, who just held off Kathleen Stevens of Blacksburg High School in Blacksburg, Virginia.

Results

Boys' Championship 5km

Boys' Team Championship

References

 NikeCrossNationals.com - Nike Cross Nationals Official Site - NXN

2009 in athletics (track and field)